The 1959 Individual Long Track European Championship was the third edition of the Long Track European Championship. The final was held on 20 August 1959 in Helsinki, Finland.

The  title was won by Josef Hofmeister of West Germany for the second time.

Venues
1st semi-final - Stockholm, 7 May 1959
2nd semi-final - Scheeßel, 7 June 1959
Semi Final - Dingolfing on 28 June 1959
Final - Helsinki, 20 August 1959

Final Classification

References 

Sports competitions in Helsinki
Motor
Motor
1950s in Helsinki
International sports competitions hosted by Sweden